Petrocelli is an American legal drama that ran for two seasons on NBC from September 11, 1974 to March 31, 1976.

Plot
Tony Petrocelli is an Italian-American, Harvard-educated lawyer, who grew up in South Boston and gave up the big money and frenetic pace of major-metropolitan life to practice in a sleepy city in Arizona named San Remo (filmed in Tucson, Arizona). His wife Maggie and he live in a house trailer in the country while waiting for their new home to be built (it never was completed over the course of the series). Tony drives an old pickup truck, always a little too fast. Petrocelli hired Pete Ritter, a local cowboy and ex-cop, as his investigator.

Format
Petrocelli works as a defense lawyer, and each episode follows a similar format, with the clients apparently certain to be convicted of a crime of which they were innocent until a late-emerging piece of evidence allows the protagonist to suggest to the jury an alternative possibility. These alternatives never were established as absolute fact, and the trial of the persons onto whom Petrocelli turned the accusation never occurred, but the doubt raised was sufficient to secure the release of his clients.

A technique used in the TV series was showing the actual crime in flashbacks from the perspective of various people involved. The flashbacks differed depending on whose recollections were being shown. To maximize the drama, the prosecution's version was always the first flashback shown (i.e. what supposedly happened), then the client's version was presented (what the client remembered happening), then, finally, after finishing his investigation, Petrocelli presented his version (generally meant to be what, in fact, occurred). This final flashback always contained elements of the prosecution's and his client's versions, but with his newfound evidence; it showed both the client's innocence and an explanation as to how and why the prosecution and client's versions differed. In other words, neither side was meant to be corrupt or lying, rather, without Petrocelli's information, both previous versions appeared to be accurate from their respective points of view.

Adaptation
Newman created the role of Petrocelli in the 1970 movie The Lawyer, loosely based on the Sam Sheppard murder case. Petrocelli was produced by Leonard Katzman.

Cast

Episodes

Pilot (1974)
A 90-minute TV movie aired as a pilot on March 16, 1974.

Season 1 (1974–75)

Season 2 (1975–76)

Guest stars
Anne Archer
Ned Beatty
Lucille Benson
Lynn Borden
Nancy Criss
Kim Darby
Susan Dey
Harrison Ford
Ron Foster
Alan Fudge
Lynda Day George
Louis Gossett Jr.
Harold Gould
Mark Hamill
Robert Hooks
Julie Kavner
Sally Kirkland
Kay Lenz
Strother Martin
Gerald McRaney
Belinda Montgomery
Lee Montgomery
James Naughton
Annette O'Toole
Della Reese
Peter Mark Richman
Robbie Rist
John Ritter
Marion Ross
John Saxon
Simon Scott
William Shatner
Loretta Swit
Joan Van Ark
Mitch Vogel
Cindy Williams
Noble Willingham
William Windom

Home media
Visual Entertainment released the complete series on DVD in Region 1 on December 16, 2016.

Books about the series
 Petrocelli: San Remo Justice: An Episode Guide and Much More by Sandra Grabman, published 2018 by BearManor Media.

References

External links

1970s American legal television series
1974 American television series debuts
1976 American television series endings
NBC original programming
Television series by CBS Studios
English-language television shows
Television shows set in Arizona